Wäinö Gustaf Palmqvist (16 January 1882 — 14 July 1964), commonly known as W. G. Palmqvist, was a Finnish architect best known as a designer of industrial and commercial buildings, especially the timber and paper mills and their wider factory milieus of the 1920s and 1930s, as well as several notable buildings in central Helsinki.

Early life and education
Wäinö Palmqvist was born to civil servant Gustaf August Palmqvist and Selma Katharina  Ingman.

He completed his secondary education in 1900, and went on to study architecture at the Helsinki Polytechnical Institute (later Helsinki University of Technology, now part of Aalto University), graduating in 1905. Afterwards, he undertook several research trips around Europe, between 1907 and 1929.

Personal life
Palmqvist was married twice: in 1910 he married Elsa  Ruuth, with whom he had three children; the couple divorced later. In 1925, he married Vivi  Candelin, and they had two children together. His son from the second marriage, also became an architect.

Career
In the early part of his career, Palmqvist worked assisting notable architects of the time, including Gustaf Nyström, Armas Lindgren and Lars Sonck.

He ran his own design bureau, first, from 1910 to 1919, jointly with his business partner , and from 1919 onwards alone.

Palmqvist's designs were characterised by massive, imposing features in the classical style, contrary to many of his contemporaries' plain and minimalist works.

Notable works
Palmqvist was a prolific designer with a career spanning four decades. Some of his more notable creations include:

Industrial and commercial buildings
Outokumpu mine facilities
United Paper Mills factories in Valkeakoski, Jämsänkoski and Myllykoski
Suomen Kaapelitehdas cable factory (now Merikortteli), Helsinki
Hufvudstadsbladet headquarters, Helsinki

Public buildings
Mehiläinen Hospital, Helsinki
Aurinkolinna children's tuberculosis sanatorium, Nastola
Central Kyme hospital, Myllykoski
Vääksy hospital
Ostrobotnia Student Nation House, Helsinki

Churches

Jämsänkoski church

Gallery

References

Finnish architects
20th-century architects
People from Kalajoki
Aalto University alumni
1882 births
1964 deaths